Ck vodka is a vodka produced by Polmos Łańcut from grain spirits and demineralized spring water. It contains 40% alcohol by volume.

See also 
 Vodka
 Distilled beverage
 Polmos Łańcut
 List of vodkas

External links 
Polmos Łańcut

Polish vodkas